Black Letter Days is the first of two albums by Frank Black and the Catholics simultaneously released in 2002 (along with Devil's Workshop).  The title implies the opposite of the term "Red Letter Days" which are holidays – a "black letter day" being all the ordinary days in a given month.

Background
When asked by writer and podcaster Jonathan Ball in 2002 if Black Letter Days and Devil's Workshop were meant to be companion pieces or stand-alone albums, Frank Black said, "Either/or, I guess. You can buy one, you can buy both. I made two records this year, so I'm releasing two records." Black added, "It's two different sections, two different lineups, two different producers. So it's sort of out of deference to some of the people involved. I didn't mix and match, I just kind of left them separate."

Black Letter Days is bookended with two covers of the same Tom Waits song, "The Black Rider". Black explained that he and the band started to play the song on tour and during recording sessions: "We tried a couple of different covers when we were recording, but that was the one that we did the best. Even then, I wasn't happy with the way we were doing it . . . so we started to fool around with it a bit and have some fun, and the result was one reel of tape with probably seven different versions of "The Black Rider," one devolving into the next and getting sillier, so what you hear is the first take and the last take. It wasn't meant to be taken seriously, we're just doing the song because we like it."

Track listing
All tracks composed by Black Francis, except where noted.

 "California Bound" – 3:24
 "Chip Away Boy" – 2:57
 "Cold Heart of Stone" – 3:19
 "Black Letter Day" – 3:26
 "Valentine and Garuda" – 3:13
 "How You Went So Far" – 4:05
 "End of Miles" – 3:49
 "1826" – 6:40
 "The Farewell Bend" – 3:23
 "Southbound Bevy" – 3:07
 "I Will Run After You" – 3:58
 "True Blue" – 1:49
 "Jane the Queen of Love" – 5:10
 "Jet Black River" – 1:51
 "21 Reasons" – 5:40
 "Whispering Weeds" – 3:39
 "The Black Rider" (Waits) – 3:09

Personnel
Frank Black and the Catholics
 Frank Black – vocals, guitar
 Scott Boutier – drums
 Eric Drew Feldman – keyboards, synthesizer, additional vocals
 Rich Gilbert – guitar, pedal steel guitar, keyboards, saxophone, additional vocals
 David McCaffery – bass, backing vocals
 Dave Phillips – guitar, pedal steel guitar, additional vocals

Additional musicians
 Moris Tepper – guitar, vocals
 Nick Vincent – maracas

Technical
 Nick Vincent – producer
 Ben Mumphrey – engineer
 Robert Vosgien – mastering
 Sammy Zax – photography
 Butter x 10 – cover design

Notes and references

2002 albums
Frank Black and the Catholics albums
SpinART Records albums
Cooking Vinyl albums